Mei Fang (born 14 November 1989) is a former Chinese professional footballer who played as a centre-back.

Club career
Mei Fang started his football career with Wuhan Optics Valley in 2008 when he was promoted to the first team. In August 2008, he had a brief trial with Ligue 2 side RC Strasbourg along with his teammate Wang Yang. In October 2008, Wuhan withdrew from the league for what it claimed was unfair punishment by the Chinese Football Association. Without a club, Mei was invited to a trial with Bundesliga side VfL Wolfsburg with Wang in November 2008. They continued their trials in Europe and moved to Belgian Pro League side Cercle Brugge in December 2008. Cercle Brugge's board later decided to offer contracts to Mei and Wang; however, Mei returned to Wuhan and joined Hubei Luyin which was newly founded by Wuhan's youth academy and Hubei's youth academy in early 2009. 

Mei made his professional debut for Hubei during the 2009 season and quickly integrated himself as a starter as the club won promotion to China League One in the 2009 season. On 28 November 2009, he scored his first league goal but missed a penalty in the penalty shootout as Hubei lost to Hunan Billows in the League Two playoff final. He refused Cercle Brugge's invitation to sign with the club again in January 2010. Mei extended his contract for two years in early 2012 after Hubei Greenery changed its name to Wuhan Zall. He was named as the club's captain on 12 March 2012 and made an impression within the team as Wuhan gained promotion to the top tier in the 2012 season. On 8 March 2013, he made his first tier debut against Jiangsu Sainty. He then scored his first goal that season on 1 June 2013 in a 1-1 draw against Qingdao Jonoon. His captaincy was stripped by the club on 18 August 2013 after a 5-1 loss against Guangzhou R&F and was handed to Cho Won-hee.

After Wuhan relegated back to the second tier, Mei was linked with fellow Chinese Super League side Beijing Guoan; however, on 1 January 2014, Mei signed for Guangzhou Evergrande. He made his debut for the club on 26 February 2014 in a 4-2 win against Melbourne Victory in the first group match of the 2014 AFC Champions League, coming on as a substitute for Alessandro Diamanti in the 88th minute. He scored his first goal for the club on 21 May 2014 in a 1-1 draw against Guizhou Renhe. On 29 July 2017, Mei suffered a cruciate ligament injury in a league match against Guangzhou R&F, which ruled him out for the rest of the 2017 season. On 18 July 2018, he made his return in a 4-0 home win against Guizhou Hengfeng.

Mei announced his retirement on 10 March 2022.

International career
Mei made his debut for the Chinese national team on 18 June 2014 in a 2-0 win against Macedonia. Mei was selected in China's 23-man squad for 2015 AFC Asian Cup  and played all 4 games in the tournament. On 12 November 2015, Mei scored his first international goal in a 12-0 victory over Bhutan in the 2018 FIFA World Cup qualification.

Career statistics

Club statistics

International statistics

International goals
Scores and results list China's goal tally first.

Honours

Club
Guangzhou Evergrande
Chinese Super League: 2014, 2015, 2016, 2017, 2019
AFC Champions League: 2015
Chinese FA Cup: 2016
Chinese FA Super Cup: 2016, 2017, 2018

References

External links
 
 
Player profile at Sodasoccer.com

1989 births
Living people
Footballers from Wuhan
Chinese footballers
Wuhan F.C. players
Guangzhou F.C. players
Association football defenders
Chinese Super League players
China League One players
China League Two players
China international footballers
2015 AFC Asian Cup players